Alois Dryák (24 February 1872 in Olšany – 6 June 1932 in Prague) was a Czech architect and professor of ornamental design. 

Dryák is most famous for the design of the ornamental detail on Art Nouveau masterpieces such as the 1905 re-design of the Hotel Europa (also known as Hotel Evropa, formerly Hotel Šroubek) in Prague, Czech Republic, done with fellow architect Bedřich Bendelmeier and architectural sculptor Ladislav Šaloun.  

The Europa and another Dryák commission, the Hotel Garni, are both located on Wenceslas Square, which is dominated by an equestrian statue of Saint Wenceslas. Dryak designed the ornate pedestal of this statue. His work was part of the architecture event in the art competition at the 1932 Summer Olympics.

Other people named Alois Dryák
Alois Vaclav Dryak - the nephew and namesake of Alois Dryák, the architect.

References

External links
Short biography (in Czech)
Slightly longer biography (in Czech)

1872 births
1932 deaths
Czech architects
Art Nouveau architects
Olympic competitors in art competitions